Płaska ,, is a village in Augustów County, Podlaskie Voivodeship, in north-eastern Poland, close to the border with Belarus. It is the seat of the gmina (administrative district) called Gmina Płaska.

The village has a population of 370.

References

Villages in Augustów County